Ashley Mae Sebera (born November 29, 1988) is an American professional wrestler, bodybuilder, gymnast, fitness competitor, and model. She is signed to WWE, where she performs on the Raw brand under the ring name Dana Brooke and is a fifteen-time 24/7 Champion.

In July 2013, Sebera signed a contract with WWE and was assigned to WWE Performance Center and developmental brand NXT in Orlando, Florida. After allying herself with Emma before being promoted on the WWE's main roster in 2016, where she began allying herself with Charlotte Flair and then with "Titus Worldwide" alongside Apollo Crews and Titus O'Neil. Brooke began appearing more frequently following her move to SmackDown in 2019, and where she was placed in a program alongside Lacey Evans, feuding with Bayley and Sasha Banks. 
That same year Brooke also re-signed with the WWE for an additional five years. In 2020, Brooke returned to the Raw brand, where she formed a tag-team with Mandy Rose until Rose was sent back to NXT.

Early life 
Ashley Mae Sebera was born on November 29, 1988, in the Cleveland suburb of Seven Hills, Ohio.

Sebera started working as a diver and gymnastics that transitioned into bodybuilding and fitness competition for 18 years until she discontinued after severely injuring both her ankles. In early 2011, Sebera graduated from Kent State University (KSU), earning a major degree of fashion, merchandising and design, and a minor degree of business administration. She used her fashion qualification to open her own boutique.

Bodybuilding and fitness career 
After she held several championships in the National Physique Committee (NPC), and earned a pro card at the International Federation of BodyBuilding & Fitness (IFBB) between 2011 and 2012, Sebera competed at the Arnold Classic, including finishing on the twelfth in 2013, finishing on the thirteenth in 2015, and finishing on the fourteenth in 2016.

Professional wrestling career

WWE

NXT (2013–2016) 
Sebera signed a contract with WWE in July 2013, and was assigned to WWE Performance Center and developmental brand NXT in Orlando, Florida, where she adopted her ring name Dana Brooke. At NXT TakeOver: Fatal 4-Way, Brooke made her first appearance for the brand in a backstage segment with Tyler Breeze. A week later, Brooke made her professional wrestling in–ring debut, where she was teaming with Sasha Banks in a losing effort against Alexa Bliss and Bayley in a tag-team match at an NXT live event.

Brooke made her first televised in-ring debut on the April 15, 2015 episode of NXT, defeating Blue Pants. Brooke was given the entrance theme music titled "Respectful" by CFO$. In the midst of this ongoing feud between Bayley and Emma, Brooke defeated Bayley with a help from Emma on the April 29 episode of NXT, prompting Brooke to form this alliance with Emma. At NXT TakeOver: Unstoppable, Brooke and Emma lost to Bayley and Charlotte after Charlotte pinned Emma. Brooke competed in a fatal–four way match on the August 22 taping of NXT TakeOver: Brooklyn (aired on the August 26 episode of NXT), where Brooke lost after Emma picked up the victory by pinning Becky Lynch.

Since September 23 episode of NXT, Brooke alongside Emma had been feuding with Asuka with Brooke losing to Asuka in Asuka's first singles match for the brand at NXT TakeOver: Respect, and Emma losing to Asuka at NXT TakeOver: London.

On the March 23, 2016 episode of NXT, Brooke was in the corner for Emma, while Emma faced Asuka in their NXT TakeOver: London rematch and lost, and this would be Brooke's final appearance for the brand.

Main roster beginnings and various alliances (2016–2019) 

Brooke made her main roster debut on the May 9, 2016 episode of Raw, where she assisted Emma to attack Lynch backstage and then three days later, on SmackDown, Brooke defeated Lynch with a help from Emma in Brooke's first singles match on the main roster. Just a few days later, Brooke's association with Emma ended abruptly after Emma suffered a legit back injury during at the WWE's live event. At Extreme Rules on May 22, Brooke interfered in the Women's Championship match between Charlotte and Natalya, costing Natalya's chance to regain the title. The next night on Raw, Brooke aligned herself with Charlotte, whom on this night has turned on her father Ric Flair.

Brooke and Charlotte began feuding with Banks. As part of the WWE draft on July 19, 2016, Brooke was drafted to Raw The next night on Raw after Summerslam, Brooke and Charlotte began feuding with Bayley, but continued feuding with Banks. In October 2016, Brooke started her own feud with Bayley after the two had a backstage confrontation, whom she defeated by using the ropes for leverage on the October 17 episode of Raw, until the rematch between the two features Brooke losing to Bayley at Hell in a Cell on October 30.

On the March 13, 2017 episode of Raw, Brooke lost to Banks and then was being berated by multiple insults by Charlotte, Brooke turned face for the first time in her career when she attacked Flair and ended her association with her. However, a week later, Brooke lost to Flair. Brooke's feud with Charlotte ended after Charlotte was drafted to SmackDown during the 2017's Superstar Shake-up.

Towards the end of 2017, Brooke aligned herself with the faction, called "Titus Worldwide" alongside Apollo Crews and Titus O'Neil. At 2018's Royal Rumble pay-per view, Brooke competed in the first ever 30–women Royal Rumble match, entering at number 8 and eliminating NXT's Kairi Sane, only to be eliminated by Torrie Wilson, lasting over 2:59. At WrestleMania 34's kickoff show, Brooke made her WrestleMania debut, where she competed in the inaugural WrestleMania Women's Battle Royal and was eliminated by Mandy Rose. On the September 3 episode of Raw, Brooke was teaming with Ember Moon to take on against Banks and Bayley in a tag-team match, and she and her partner lost when a distraction from Crews and O'Neil causes Brooke to get pinned by Banks, in which led to Brooke ending her association with Crews and O'Neil.

After disbanding with the faction in the early September, Brooke has been a bit of a losing streak before taking part at the first-ever all women's pay–per–view, called Evolution, where she competed in the battle royal for a future women's championship match, where she lost after being eliminated by Moon. At 2019's Royal Rumble pay-per view, Brooke competed in the second women's Royal Rumble match, where she entered at number 22 and lasted 7:17, but was eliminated by NXT UK's Rhea Ripley. On the March 11 episode of Raw, Brooke confronted the Raw Women's Champion Ronda Rousey for disrespecting wrestling and challenging her to a title match until Rousey accepts by attacking Brooke. The following week on Raw, Brooke lost to Rousey in over a few seconds, who the latter successfully retained her Raw Women's title. Brooke talked about that the promo with Rousey was a Paul Heyman-inspired shoot promo that enabled her to express her actual frustrations and her true feelings.

At WrestleMania 35's kickoff show, Brooke competed the second WrestleMania Women's Battle Royal, where despite scoring two eliminations, Brooke was being eliminated by Sonya Deville. After defeating Tamina and Ruby Riott on Main Event in mid-April, during "A Moment of Bliss" on the April 29 episode of Raw, Bliss announced Brooke as one of the participants for the women's Money in the Bank ladder match but at 2019's Money in the Bank pay-per view, she was unsuccessful at winning the women's MITB ladder match.

Brooke began feuding with Sarah Logan on Main Event, where the two traded wins with one another. Their feud involved an incident where Brooke was injured via cut on her head in their match on June 18, 2019.

Brand switches and in-ring competition (2019–2020) 
On October 16, Brooke was drafted to SmackDown as part of the 2019's WWE draft. In line with Brooke's move to the brand, she began receiving more television time and showcased her improved skill and move-sets. On the November 8 episode of SmackDown, Brooke and Carmella defeated Rose and Deville to qualify as part of Team SmackDown at Survivor Series. At 2019's Survivor Series pay-per view, Team SmackDown lost to Team NXT.

In December 2019, Brooke revealed that she had signed a five-year multi-deal to remain with WWE. On the December 20 episode of SmackDown, Brooke had a match against Bayley and was defeated again via pin-fall. After the match, Banks joined Bayley in the ring to intimidate Brooke, but Lacey Evans soon rushed to her assistance. On the December 27 episode of SmackDown, Brooke and Evans teamed up against Bayley and Banks in a tag-team match. Banks won via submission, using her "Bank Statement" finisher on Brooke. On the January 3, 2020 episode of SmackDown, Brooke and Evans faced Banks and Bayley again, participating in a triple threat tag-team match against Alexa Bliss and Nikki Cross, with Brooke won via a pin-fall on Banks. Brooke was an entrant in the third women's Royal Rumble match at the 2020 pay-per-view.

On the March 6, 2020 episode of SmackDown, Brooke teamed up with Carmella in another tag-team match, where the two lost to Sonya Deville and Mandy Rose. Brooke was scheduled to take part in the SmackDown Women's Championship match at WrestleMania 36, however, the match had to be changed with her being taken out of that match due to Brooke being quarantining as a precautionary measures during the COVID-19 pandemic in the United States. On the April 17 episode of SmackDown, Brooke defeated Naomi to qualify for the women's Money in the Bank ladder match at the 2020 pay-per-view. On the April 24 episode of SmackDown, Brooke teamed up with Carmella in a tag-team match for the Women's Tag Team Championship, but lost to the defenders Alexa Bliss and Nikki Cross.

Brooke took part in the women's Money in the Bank ladder match. Brooke did not win but took part in several comedic segments. In the match she retrieved a briefcase leading her to believe she won. In another she slipped on a wet floor and hit her head. On May 15, Naomi challenged Brooke for a rematch and Brooke won by pin-fall.

Teaming with Mandy Rose (2020–2021) 
Brooke was traded back to Raw on September 28, 2020, where she formed a tag-team with Mandy Rose. Together they defeated Natalya and Lana in their first tag-team match. On the November 2 episode of Raw, Brooke and Rose challenged Nia Jax and Shayna Baszler for the Women's Tag Team Championship, but were unsuccessful.

On the November 16 episode of Raw, Brooke and Rose partnered with Asuka once again, defeating the team of Jax, Baszler, and Lana. Rose received a legitimate injury, which resulted in Brooke and Rose being pulled from their upcoming involvement during the 2020 Survivor Series pay-per-view event. To remove Brooke from the event, writers worked an angle in which Brooke was attacked by Reckoning, leaving her unable to compete. On November 30, Brooke defeated Reckoning in singles competition. On December 7, Brooke partnered with Ricochet and defeated Slapjack and Reckoning. Brooke defeated Baszler via disqualification after Jax interfered in the match. Rose made her return from injury, saving Brooke and reuniting their alliance. The following week Brooke and Rose lost a tag-team match to Jax and Baszler. On December 28, Brooke was again defeated by Baszler. On January 4, 2021, Brooke challenged Baszler to a rematch after the latter attacked Rose. Brooke won the match-up via pin fall.

Brooke and Rose participated in the "Tag Team Turmoil" event at WrestleMania 37. On May 3, Charlotte defeated Brooke via submission. On May 10, Brooke, Rose and Asuka defeated Baszler, Jax and Charlotte in a tag team match. On May 31, Brooke and Rose defeated Naomi and Lana in a tag-team match. A feud with Tamina and Natalya resulted in Rose being defeated by the latter at Hell in a Cell. On the June 28 edition of Raw, Brooke and Rose teamed with Rhea Ripley but were defeated by Charlotte, Tamina and Natalya.

24/7 Champion (2021–2022) 
WWE also debuted a new entrance theme for Brooke, titled "See You" which is performed by Def Rebel. In October 2021, Brooke entered the Queen's Crown tournament, where she lost to Shayna Baszler in the first round. On the November 22 episode of Raw, Brooke pinned Cedric Alexander to win the WWE 24/7 Championship, her first title win in WWE. Brooke then took part in a 10-woman tag team match as part of Liv Morgan and Becky Lynch's feud. Brooke was on Morgan's winning team.
On the December 8, 2022 episode of WWE Main Event, Brooke defended the 24/7 Title against Tamina. On the December 28 edition of RAW, Brooke successfully defended the 24/7 Championship again. She partnered with Reggie in a mixed tag-team match, defeating R-Truth and Tamina. The following week Brooke and Reggie defended the title again, this time against Tamina and Akira Tozawa. On the January 24, 2022 episode Raw, Brooke teamed with Rhea Ripley and Liv Morgan to defeat Nikki A.S.H., Tamina, and Carmella.

WWE continued to feature Brooke in comedic backstage vignettes including Reggie, Tamina and Tozawa. On March 29, 2022, that storyline progressed with Brooke's getting engaged to Reggie. On the April 18 episode of Raw, Brooke lost the 24/7 Title during a storyline double-wedding ceremony where she was pinned by her partner, Reggie. Reggie then lost the title to Tamina, who in turn lost it to Tozawa. Brooke then won the 24/7 Title for a third time, later that same night. On May 2, Brooke lost the 24/7 title to Nikki A.S.H during a backstage attack. Brooke soon regained the title via pinfall in a 24/7 Championship match. Brooke also requested a divorce from Reggie, after he attempted to pin her. On May 31, Brooke lost the championship after she was pinned by Tamina. On June 6, Brooke regained the 24/7 Championship from Tozawa and successfully defended the belt against Becky Lynch with the help of interference from Asuka. On June 13, Brooke was scheduled for a championship rematch with Lynch, but the latter attacked Brooke before the match. On the June 20, 2022, taping of WWE Main Event (to be aired on June 24) in Lincoln, Nebraska, Brooke lost the WWE 24/7 Championship to Doudrop, who was almost immediately defeated for it by Nikki A.S.H. in which Brooke defeated Nikki A.S.H. to regain the championship. Brooke missed the following WWE tapings after she was involved in a non-fatal car accident. Brooke lost and regained the 24/7 championship title on the July 18, 2022 edition of RAW. Brooke then lost and regained the 24/7 Championship at multiple house shows. As of October 30, 2022, Brooke had held the WWE 24/7 Championship 15 times. On November 7, 2022, Brooke once again lost the 24/7 Title to Nikki Cross. WWE retired the 24/7 Championship later that same day.

Other media 
Brooke appeared in five WWE video games, starting with WWE 2K17, and subsequently in WWE 2K18, WWE 2K19, WWE 2K20, and WWE 2K22, and was included as DLC in WWE 2K Battlegrounds.

Two action figures of Brooke have been produced over the years. She has appeared in the 68th and 81st series of Mattel wrestling action figures. She has also been featured on numerous Topps branded collectible trading cards.

Personal life 
Sebera was in a relationship with fellow American bodybuilder Dallas McCarver until his death on August 22, 2017. From 2018 to 2019, she dated NBA professional basketball player Enes Kanter Freedom. She is now in a relationship with Cuban boxer Ulysses Diaz. In July 2021, Sebera and Diaz got engaged. In June 2022, Sebera was involved in a non-fatal car crash. The accident forced her to miss her wrestling commitments with WWE. She later revealed that the car accident was "bad" but she would recover quickly.

Championships and accomplishments

Bodybuilding and fitness 
National Physique Committee
 World Amateur Bodybuilding Championship (1 silver)
 Mr. Olympia
 Female Image Award (2017)
 Best Female of the Year (2017)

Professional wrestling 
 Pro Wrestling Illustrated
 Ranked No. 26 of the top 50 female wrestlers in the PWI Female 50 in 2016
 WWE 
 WWE 24/7 Championship (15 times)

References

External links 

 
 
 

1988 births
American female bodybuilders
American female professional wrestlers
Fitness and figure competitors
Living people
Professional wrestling managers and valets
Professional wrestlers from Ohio
People from Seven Hills, Ohio
21st-century American women
WWE 24/7 Champions
21st-century professional wrestlers